Evy á Lakjuni (born 12 August 1999) is a Faroese football midfielder who currently plays for KÍ and the Faroe Islands women's national football team.

Honours 

KÍ

1. deild kvinnur: 2014, 2015, 2016, 2019, 2020
Steypakappingin kvinnur: 2014, 2015, 2016, 2020

References 

1999 births
Living people
Faroese women's footballers
Faroe Islands women's youth international footballers
Faroe Islands women's international footballers
Women's association football midfielders
KÍ Klaksvík players